The 1995–96 Michigan State Spartans men's basketball team represented Michigan State University in the 1995–96 NCAA Division I men's basketball season. The team played their home games at Breslin Center in East Lansing, Michigan and were members of the Big Ten Conference. They were coached by Tom Izzo in his first year as head coach after 11 years as an assistant coach. The Spartans finished the season with a record of 16–16, 9–9 in Big Ten play to finish in a tie for fifth place. They received a bid to the National Invitation Tournament where they defeated Washington before losing to Fresno State in the second round.

The season marked the last time, as of 2023, that Michigan State did not finish the season with a winning record.

Previous season
The Spartans finished the 1994–95 season with a record of 22–6, 14–4 in Big Ten play to finish in second place. Michigan State received an at-large bid to the NCAA Tournament as the No. 3 seed in the Southeast region where they lost to Weber State in the First Round.

Roster and statistics

Schedule and results

|-
!colspan=9 style=| Non-conference regular season

|-
!colspan=9 style=|Big Ten regular season

|-
!colspan=9 style=|NIT

References

Michigan State Spartans men's basketball seasons
Michigan State
Michigan State
Michigan State Spartans men's b
Michigan State Spartans men's b